was an international table tennis player from Japan.

Table Tennis career
From 1952 to 1953 he won two medals in the singles and team events in the World Table Tennis Championships and four medals in the Asian Table Tennis Championships.  Hiroji was the first person to use a sponge on his racket, a common feature of all modern table tennis rackets.  Although, at the time it may have seemed as though this technological advancement gave him an unfair advantage, it has truly brought table tennis into the modern age and as the Olympic sport we know today.

He won bronze medal in the team event at the 1952 World Table Tennis Championships and a gold medal in the men's singles at the 1952 World Table Tennis Championships.

See also
 List of table tennis players
 List of World Table Tennis Championships medalists

References

External links

 

Japanese male table tennis players
People from Aomori (city)
1925 births
2000 deaths